Khattab (also spelled Khutab or Khattab)  is a town in northwestern Syria, administratively part of the Hama Governorate, northwest of Hama located near the Orontes River River. Nearby localities include Qamhana to the east, Shihat Hama to the southeast, Kafr al-Tun to the southwest, al-Majdal to the west, Mhardeh and Halfaya to the northwest and Taybat al-Imam to the northeast. According to the Central Bureau of Statistics, Khitab had a population of 10,830 in the 2004 census. Its inhabitants are predominantly Sunni Muslims.

In late 1829, during the Ottoman era, Khitab was part of the Sanjak (District) of Hama. It consisted of 55 feddan and paid 5,610 qirsh in taxes to the treasury. In the 1930s about two-thirds of the village's lands were owned by the al-Azm family. In 1838, Khitab was recorded as a Sunni Muslim village.

References

Bibliography

 

Populated places in Hama District
Towns in Hama Governorate